The Fokker S.I was a Dutch primary trainer, first flown in 1919 and the first of a family of trainers from the Fokker company.

Development
The S.I was designed by Reinhold Platz as a primary trainer with a cantilever parasol wing with two side-by side seats for instructor and pupil in a wide cockpit. It first flew in early 1919 at Schwerin. Although the prototype performed well, the unusual cantilever parasol wing was not liked and only three production aircraft were built.

Two production aircraft were powered by  Le Rhône engines and were exported to the USSR and one other aircraft was built for the United States Army Air Service for evaluation at McCook Field. The USAAS aircraft was powered by a  Curtiss OX-5 engine and was designated the TW-4 (Trainer Water-cooled).

Operators

Soviet Air Force

United States Army Air Service as the TW-4.

Specifications (TW-4)

See also

Notes

References

 The Illustrated Encyclopedia of Aircraft (Part Work 1982-1985), 1985, Orbis Publishing, Page 1899

1910s Dutch military trainer aircraft
S.I
Aircraft first flown in 1919
High-wing aircraft
Single-engined tractor aircraft